Knut Hahn (born 19 December 1964) is a German former professional footballer who played as a midfielder.

References

1964 births
Living people
German footballers
Association football midfielders
Kickers Offenbach players
VfR Bürstadt players
SV Sandhausen players
2. Bundesliga players
Kickers Offenbach managers